The Chinese Train Control System (CTCS) is a train control system used on railway lines in People's Republic of China.  CTCS is similar to the European Train Control System (ETCS).

It has two subsystems: ground subsystem and onboard subsystem. The ground subsystem may based on balise, track circuit, radio communication network (GSM-R), and Radio Block Center (RBC). The onboard subsystem includes onboard computer and communication module.

CTCS Levels 
There consists of 5 different levels (Level 0 to Level 5).

Levels 2, 3, and 4 are back-compatible with lower levels.

CTCS Level 0 (CTCS-0) 
For railway lines where operational speeds are below :
 Track configuration: Track circuit
 Cab configuration: CTCS Universal Cab Signalling (UCS) + Train operating service unit (TOSU/LKJ) + Driver Machine Interface (DMI).
Level 0 is used on lines with conventional trackside signalling. Train drivers follow trackside signals primarily, with cab signals as back-up. UCS receives train fixed block occupation signals from track circuits and is shown as cab signals using digital signal processes. TOSU/LKJ is used to supervise speed limits and can only advise train drivers on braking curves. The drives are mainly responsible for maintaining train speed protection.

CTCS Level 1 (CTCS-1) 
For railway lines where operational speeds are below :
 Track configuration: Track circuit + Balise
Cab configuration: Primary cab signalling + ATP +  Enhanced Safety Train Operation Supervision and Recording Device (LKJ) + DMI + Recording units + Balise Transmission Module
Balises are installed in addition to track circuits. Automatic train protection (ATP) is enabled on CTCS level 1. Drivers use cab signals as primary signals. Train circuits are responsible for detecting track occupancy and integrity. Temporary speed restrictions, train positions and track data are provided intermittently.

CTCS Level 2 (CTCS-2) 
For high-speed railways where operational speeds are below :
 Track configuration: Track circuit (ZPW/UM) + Balise + Lineside Electronic Unit (LEU) + Train Control Centre (TCC) + Temporary Speed Restriction Server (TSRS)
 Cab configuration: ATP + Vital Computer (VC) + Specific Transmission Module (STM, for receiving track circuit information from non-CTCS-2 systems) + BTM + DMI + Speed Detection Unit (SDU) + Recording units
The track circuit is used both for train occupation detection and movement authorization, its architecture is similar to TVM-300. Balises and track circuit serves to provide intermittent trackside information and automatic train protection (ATP) to cab equipment. Trackside signalling is not mandatory and can be replaced with cab signalling using DMI. LKJ can be equipped as redundancy on CTCS-0 lines. Minimum headways on CTCS-2 is 180 seconds.

This system is compatible with ETCS-1.

CTCS Level 3 (CTCS-3) 
For high-speed railway of above :
Track configuration:  Track circuit (ZPW/UM) + Balise + LEU + Radio block control (RBC)
Cab configuration: VC + GSM-R Radio transmission unit (GSM-R RTU) + BTM + DMI + SDU + Recording units
CTCS-3 introduces GSM-R radio for bidirectional data transmission. Track circuits are used as a redundant system to CTCS-3. Train positions can be accurately calculated using balises and onboard odometers which are transmitted to Radio Block Centres (RBCs). Authorisation of train movement is created by RBCs and transmitted onto on-board cab equipment using GSM-R. Using both trackside equipment and onboard equipment, ATP can be achieved. Trackside signalling is not mandatory and can be replaced with cab signalling using DMI. It is considered to be a "quasi-moving-block" system.

This is currently in use for all of the  lines on China's high-speed railway system, with a backup system of CTCS-2. CTCS-3 is equivalent to ETCS-2.

CTCS Level 4 (CTCS-4) (proposed) 
Track configuration: Radio block control (RBC)
Cab configuration: VC + GSM-R RTU + SDU + DMI + Recording units + GPS (or other positioning systems) + Train integrity detection device
It would feature the complete elimination of track circuits, moving blocks and self-train-integrity-check, which would significantly reduce the number of conventional track signalling equipment needed. Train integrity would be completely detected entirely through CTCS-3. Data transmission would be performed on GSM-R or LTE-M. Trackside signalling is not mandatory and can be replaced with cab signalling using DMI.

Currently, Level 4 is not in use on any tracks and exists only as a conceptual system equivalent to ETCS-3. It is being developed and defined by signalling manufacturers in China.

See also

 Chinese railway signalling

References

Railway signalling in China
European Rail Traffic Management System
Train protection systems